Alain Mabit is a titular organist of the Grand Organ Cavaillé-Coll of the , and 20th century music writing teacher at the Conservatoire de Paris. He is also a composer.

Works 
 Night songs for organ.
 Sphère d’influence for wind ensemble.
 Segments for organ.

Discography 
Prélude et Fugue sur BACH (Franz Liszt) 
Trois préludes de choral of the Opus 122 by Brahms
Toccata (Charles-Marie Widor) organ of the Abbaye aux hommes at Caen

References

External links 

French classical organists
Year of birth missing (living people)
Conservatoire de Paris alumni
Academic staff of the Conservatoire de Paris
French male organists
Living people
Male classical organists